The Minister of Transport is a Councillor of State and Chief of the Norwegian Ministry of Transport. The post has been held by Jon-Ivar Nygård of the Labour Party since 2021. The ministry is responsible for policy and public operations within postal services, telecommunications, civil aviation, public roads, rail transport and public transport, including ferry services that are part of national roads and coastal transport infrastructure. The ministry has seven agencies and four limited companies, including the airport operator Avinor, railway operator Vy, the Norwegian National Rail Administration, the Norwegian Public Roads Administration and Norway Post. There are also inspectorates and authorities related to accident investigation, civil aviation, and railways.

The position was created with the ministry on 22 February 1946, when Nils Langhelle (Labour) was appointed. The ministry and minister position were split out from the Ministry of Labour. Twenty-eight people have held the position, representing six parties. Sixteen people have represented the Labour Party, five the Centre Party, two each the Christian Democratic Party, the Conservative Party and the Liberal Party and one for the Progress Party. The longest-sitting minister is Kjell Opseth (Labour) who sat a week short of six years. Lars Leiro (Centre) sat for only four weeks, giving him the shortest tenure. He both succeeded and preceded Trygve Bratteli, the only person to have held the position twice and the only officeholder to later become Prime Minister.

Key
The following lists the minister, their party, date of assuming and leaving office, their tenure in years and days, and the cabinet they served in.

Ministers

References

Transport and Communications
Norway
Norway
1946 establishments in Norway
Transport organisations based in Norway